Benjamin Drew Ellis (December 27, 1914  May 18, 1988) was an American football offensive tackle who played for two seasons in the National Football League (NFL) for the Philadelphia Eagles. After playing college football for the TCU Horned Frogs, he was drafted by the Eagles in the third round of the 1937 NFL Draft and played for the team from 1938 to 1939. He started 19 of the team's 22 games over the course of the two seasons at left tackle. He served in World War II for the United States Army.

References

1914 births
1988 deaths
People from Ochiltree County, Texas
Players of American football from Texas
American football offensive tackles
TCU Horned Frogs football players
Philadelphia Eagles players
United States Army personnel of World War II